David Verburg (born May 14, 1991) is an American track and field athlete who specializes in the 400 meters. He holds gold medals in the 4 × 400 m relay from the 2016 Olympics; the 2013 and 2015 World Championships; and the 2014 Indoor World Championships.

Personal
David Verburg was born on May 14, 1991 in Oklahoma City, Oklahoma. He attended high school at E. C. Glass High School in Lynchburg, Virginia, graduating in 2009.  He attended George Mason University, earning his degree in Sports Management in 2013.

Athletics

High School & College career
Verburg holds the 400m dash record at his high school, E.C. Glass. with a time of 47.15 seconds. He ran track in college for the George Mason Patriots where he was a four-time outdoor and seven-time indoor All-American.

International career
In 2010, Verburg gained his first International experience at the IAAF World Junior Championships in Moncton, Canada, winning Gold in the 4×400 meter relay.

Verburg was a double gold medalist in the 400 meter dash and 4×400 meter relay at the 2012 NACAC Under-23 Championships in Athletics in Irapuato, Mexico.

At the 2013 USA Outdoor Track and Field Championships Verburg finished sixth in the 400 meter dash.
The top six finishers were eligible to run in the 4×400 relay at the 2013 World Championships in Athletics and as such Verburg was selected to the U.S. team for the World Championships.

In the same year,  Verburg ran in both the heats and the finals of the 4×400 meter relay at the 2013 World Championships in Moscow, Russia. His team won a gold medal and set a world leading time of 2:58.71.

At the 2015 World Championships, Verburg ran in the finals of the 4×400 meter relay, winning gold and again setting a world-leading time of 2:57.82.

Animal rights
Near the end of October 2018, Verburg ran into traffic at an intersection in Clermont, Florida to rescue a turtle that wandered into traffic. Becoming a viral video on social media, Verburg was a guest on The Ellen DeGeneres Show. In 2019, Verburg would launch the Golden Tortoise Rescue Foundation in his home state of Florida. Due to his views on animal rights, Verburg also has a vegan diet.

References

External links 

 
 
 
 
 
 

Living people
1991 births
African-American male track and field athletes
American male sprinters
Athletes (track and field) at the 2016 Summer Olympics
People from Kingsport, Tennessee
Medalists at the 2016 Summer Olympics
Olympic gold medalists for the United States in track and field
Track and field athletes from Oklahoma
USA Outdoor Track and Field Championships winners
World Athletics indoor record holders (relay)
World Athletics Championships athletes for the United States
World Athletics Championships medalists
World Athletics Indoor Championships winners
World Athletics Championships winners
21st-century African-American sportspeople